Stefano DellaVigna (born June 19, 1973) is an Italian economist and the Daniel E. Koshland, Sr. Distinguished Professor of Economics and Professor of Business Administration at the University of California, Berkeley. Born in Como, Italy, he emigrated to the United States when he was 18. He joined the faculty of the University of California, Berkeley in 2002, after receiving his Ph.D. from Harvard University. His research focuses on behavioral economics, and he is a co-director of the Initiative for Behavioral Economics and Finance. He has published studies on the effects of Fox News on voter behavior, the effects of violent films on violent crime rates, and the response of stock market investors to corporate announcements of disappointing earnings.

In 2021 he was named a Fellow of the Econometric Society.

References

External links
Faculty page

1973 births
Italian economists
Living people
Italian emigrants to the United States
Haas School of Business faculty
Bocconi University alumni
Harvard University alumni
Econometricians
People from Como
Sloan Research Fellows
Behavioral economists
Fellows of the Econometric Society